DoReDoS is a Moldovan trio from Rîbnița, Transnistria. The group consists of Marina Djundyet, Eugeniu Andrianov and Sergiu Mîța. They represented Moldova in the Eurovision Song Contest 2018 in Lisbon, Portugal, with the song "My Lucky Day". They had previously attempted to represent Moldova at Eurovision in 2015 and 2016. They won New Wave 2017 for Moldova.

History

The “DoReDos” trio was founded in 2011,  in Rîbnița town (Transnistria). In 2017, they became winners at the New Wave (Новая волна) competition where they represented the Moldova. In March 2018, they began to perform under the Bis Music music label. Philipp Kirkorov, who is also the composer of the song "My Lucky Day", took an active role in preparing the trio for the Eurovision Song Contest 2018 and the group tour. At the competition, the group scored 209 points and finished in 10th place.

Discography

Singles

References

2011 establishments in Moldova
Eurovision Song Contest entrants of 2018
Eurovision Song Contest entrants for Moldova
Moldovan musical groups
Musical groups established in 2011
Pop-folk music groups
New Wave winners